The Derbyshire Dales Narrow Gauge Railway was a short,  narrow-gauge railway located at Rowsley South at Peak Rail. It operated ex-industrial diesel locomotives and carriages.

History
The DDNGR was established by Henry and Mary Frampton-Jones at Rowsley South during the 1990s.  They had accumulated a collection of narrow-gauge rolling stock at various other railways and needed a running line. At Rowsley South the area behind the turntable was found to be suitable and work started on clearing and laying the track. 1998 saw the arrival of the first items of rolling stock, and the two 40-foot containers used as engine sheds.

In 2001 the Derbyshire Dales Narrow Gauge Supporters Group formed to support the narrow-gauge operation.

Initially, the main running line ran from Nannygoat crossing, through Parkside Station, across a level crossing to a buffer stop beyond where the containers were positioned. A loop was created at Parkside and various sidings laid to access the containers. Top and tail operation was the norm, with a locomotive formed either side of the carriages.

HMRI approval was gained for operations in 2004, and the first DDNGR passengers were carried on Easter Sunday, 11 April 2004. The railway operated on 44 days (mostly Sundays) and carried approximately 1,400 passengers in 2009.

During 2018 -  2019 the track was lifted and stock sold. The site is now being developed by the Ashover Light Railway Society.

Rolling stock

Locomotives

References

External links
 DDNGR page on Peak Rail Website

Heritage railways in Derbyshire
2 ft gauge railways in England